Edgar Daniel González Brítez (born 4 October 1979) is a Paraguayan football defensive midfielder. He currently plays for Cerro Porteño.

Career
In June 2007, González was selected for the Paraguay national football team that competed in the 2007 Copa America. After that tournament, he was transferred to the Argentine side Estudiantes de La Plata. Having no opportunity to play, he moved on loan to Olimpia.

In September, González was again loaned out to Alianza Lima.

External links

1979 births
Living people
Paraguayan footballers
Paraguay international footballers
Paraguayan expatriate footballers
Cerro Porteño players
Club Guaraní players
Club Olimpia footballers
Estudiantes de La Plata footballers
Club Alianza Lima footballers
Peruvian Primera División players
Expatriate footballers in Argentina
Expatriate footballers in Peru
Association football midfielders